Charles Frederick Cooper (January 3, 1852 – March 11, 1919) was an English-born Free Baptist clergyman and political figure in Nova Scotia, Canada. He represented Queens County in the Nova Scotia House of Assembly from 1901 to 1911 as a Liberal member.

He was born in Birmingham, the son of John Cooper, and educated there and in London. In 1899, he married Alverotta Ophelia Hilton. Cooper lived in Caledonia Corner in Queens County and Halifax. He died in 1919.

References 
 A Directory of the Members of the Legislative Assembly of Nova Scotia, 1758-1958, Public Archives of Nova Scotia (1958)

1852 births
1919 deaths
Nova Scotia Liberal Party MLAs
Canadian Baptists
19th-century Baptists